Monk station is a Montreal Metro station in the borough of Le Sud-Ouest in Montreal, Quebec, Canada. It is operated by the Société de transport de Montréal (STM) and serves Green Line. The station is located in the Ville-Émard district.

Art and architecture
The station structure was designed by Blais & Bélanger and  features many works of art, including the large sculpture Pic et Pelle by artist Germain Bergeron.  Monk also features many balconies that overlook the main station below, however they have been closed for the safety of the visually impaired.

Germain Bergeron considered many different ideas for the public art for this station.  His first concept was to create a series of flying saucers that were suspended from the roof of the station, and were to move with the wind generated by passing trains.  However, this was deemed too dangerous by authorities, and the idea was cancelled.

The current two giant statues of workers constructing the Metro were to have been accompanied by a third, representing a foreman, but this idea was judged superfluous and scrapped.

Origin of the name
The station is named for boulevard Monk, itself named to honour the Monk family. It is unsure which member is being honoured. It could be Sir James Monk (1745-1826), a prosecutor who served on Quebec's vice admiralty court from 1778 to 1788 and subsequently became Montreal's chief justice from 1793 to 1820. Alternatively, the boulevard and the station could be named for Frederick D. Monk, an attorney who along with Joseph-Ulric Émard purchased land belonging to the Davidson family in order to develop it, the area became Ville-Émard.

Connecting bus routes

Nearby points of interest 
 Centre hospitalier Ville Émard
 Douglas Hospital
 École Dollard-des-Ormeaux
 École St-Jean-de-Matha
 École Honoré-Mercier

References

External links 
 Monk Station- Official site
 Montreal by Metro www.metrodemontreal.com - photos and information
 2011 STM System Map

Green Line (Montreal Metro)
Le Sud-Ouest
Railway stations in Canada opened in 1978